The eighth season of Skal vi danse? started on 8 September 2012.

Couples

Scoring chart

Red numbers indicate the lowest score for each week.
Green numbers indicate the highest score for each week.
 indicates the couple eliminated that week.
 The couple are in the bottom two that week.
 indicates the winning couple.
 indicates the runner-up couple.
 indicates the third-place couple.

Highest and lowest scoring performances of the series 
The best and worst performances in each dance according to the judges' marks are as follows:

Average chart

Dance schedule
The celebrities and professional partners danced one of these routines for each corresponding week.
 Week 1: Waltz or Cha-Cha-Cha
 Week 2: Tango or Paso Doble
 Week 3: Foxtrot or Jive (Big Band theme)
 Week 4: Samba
 Week 5: Quickstep or Rumba (Disney theme)
 Week 6: One unlearned dance (Country theme)
 Week 7: One unlearned dance (1960s theme) &  Team Cha-Cha-Cha or Jive
 Week 8: Showdance
 Week 9: One unlearned dance, one repeated dance
 Week 10: One unlearned dance, one repeated dance
 Week 11: One ballroom dance, one Latin dance & Showdance

Songs

Week 1

Running order

Week 2

Running order

Week 3 Big Band Night

Running order

Week 4

Running order

Week 5 Disney Night

Running order

Week 6

Running order

Week 7

Running order

Week 8

Running order

Week 9

Running order

Week 10

Running order

Call-out Order
The table below lists the order in which the contestants' fates were revealed. The order of the safe couples doesn't reflect the viewer voting results.

 This couple came in first place with the judges.
 This couple came in last place with the judges.
 This couple came in last place with the judges and was eliminated.
 This couple came in first place with the judges and was eliminated.
 This couple was eliminated.
 This couple won the competition.
 This couple came in second in the competition.

Dance chart

See also
Skal vi danse?
Skal vi danse? (season 4)
Skal vi danse? (season 5)
Skal vi danse? (season 6)
Skal vi danse? (season 7)
Dancing with the Stars International Versions

References

External links

2012 Norwegian television seasons
Skal vi danse?